Casterton  is a town in Victoria, Australia, located on the Glenelg Highway, 42 kilometres east of the South Australian border, in the Shire of Glenelg.  The Glenelg River passes through the town. Casterton is named after the village of Casterton in south-east Cumbria in England.

History
Prior to white settlement, Aboriginal people of the Konongwootong Gundidj clan lived in the local area. The first white explorers to pass through the area were the expedition led by Major Thomas Mitchell in 1836 who spoke enthusiastically of the landscape's green hills, soft soils and flowery plains, describing it as ideal for farming and settlement, naming it Australia Felix. 
The first white settlers in the area were the Henty brothers who had landed in Portland, Victoria in 1834 and who claimed 28,000 hectares between what are now the towns of Casterton and Coleraine. 'Warrock' Station, a sheep farming settlement, was established in 1841, 26 km north of what would be Casterton.

The township of Casterton began on the crossing site of the Glenelg River, the location having been surveyed in 1840, and the first pub, the Glenelg Inn, was established in 1846 with a post-office opening the following year. The early history of the region was marred by violent clashes between settlers and Indigenous people, including multiple murders of Aboriginals that took place near Casterton in the late 1830s and early 1840s.

In 1891, a large number of Casterton women signed the Women's Suffrage Petition to be tabled in the Victorian Parliament to grant women the right to vote (which was not allowed until 1908). By the 1890s, increasing soil erosion saw wheat-farming around Casterton begin to decline and it was largely replaced by meat, wool and dairy farming. Casterton's population expanded in the early 20th century, especially in the 1920s with the arrival of large numbers of soldier-settler farmers and during the post-war era in the 1950s.

The Rail line to Casterton was closed 12 September 1977.

The town's population began to decline in the 1990s which was consistent with the statewide trend of decreasing populations in many rural areas and the ageing of the local population. As of the 2021 census, the town had a population of 1,673 with the average age being 58.

Traditional ownership
The formally recognised traditional owners for the area in which Casterton sits are the Gunditjmara People who are represented by the Gunditj Mirring Traditional Owners Aboriginal Corporation.

Timeline
 1840 Location of Casterton is first surveyed
 1846-1847 Opening of Casterton's first pub and post office
 1855 First Horse Racing Meet held in Casterton
 1870 The local newspaper-The Casterton News-is first published
 1875 Casterton Football Club is founded
 1884 A railway link from Branxholme, Victoria to Casterton is established.
 1908 Establishment of Casterton Hospital
 1936 Official Opening of Casterton Town Hall
 1955 Casterton Elementary High School is built on the current site (now Casterton Secondary College)
 1977 Railway closed.

The kelpie

Casterton lays claim to be the birthplace of the breed of working dog known as the kelpie, a Scottish term meaning 'Water Sprite' and a name given to a black and tan bitch British working collie owned by Scotsman George Patterson, a farmer who lived north of Casterton in the 1870s. Patterson exchanged 'Kelpie' for a horse and the dog's new owner, a drover named Jack Gleeson, took her to Ardlethan, NSW where she mated with a black male Rutherford Sheepdog named 'Moss', producing several litters. Kelpie later mated with another male named 'Caesar', producing a female pup named 'King's Kelpie' which grew to become a champion sheepdog.

The breed was further developed and refined during the next few decades. Ardlethan also lays claim to be the birthplace of the breed.

In 1997, a working dog auction was held in Casterton, an annual event which grew to become the Casterton Kelpie Festival in 2001. The auction and festival event is now held each June in Casterton.

To mark Casterton's 150th anniversary celebrations in 1996, a bronze sculpture of a kelpie by artist Peter Corlett was unveiled in front of Casterton's Town Hall.

The Fleur de Lys
A large version of the Fleur de Lys, used as the emblem of the Scouts, is carved into Toorak Hill, a steep hill overlooking the eastern end of Casterton's main thoroughfare. The design has a circumference of 91 metres. In 1935, the Boy-Scouts and Cubs, in honour of the Silver Jubilee Celebrations of King George V, carved a large-scale version of the words 'The King' into the hill, each letter some six metres long. Encouraged by the success of this, the Scouts, to celebrate the 1941 opening of the town's new Scout-hall, carved the Fleur de Lys emblem into the hill and lit it up at night with the aid of a series of tins filled with oil-soaked rags which were set alight. Years later, the design was lit by electric strip lighting and is illuminated on most evenings throughout the year.

Community
The town has a Community Centre, a weekly local newspaper and hosts many activities throughout the year.

The town has an Australian Rules football team competing in the Western Border Football League. Casterton Football Club, originally formed in 1875, won the Western District League Premiership 12 times between 1892 and 1963 and has won the Western Border League Premiership twice, in 1969 and 1990.

The Casterton Racing Club schedules around four horse race meetings a year including the Casterton Cup meeting in May or June.

Golfers play at the Casterton Golf Club on Penola Road.

The town has a public outdoor swimming pool, a hospital, a secondary college and State and Catholic primary schools.

Notable residents
Notable residents of Casterton include:
 William Macmahon Ball (diplomat, radio announcer & academic)
 Clarice Beckett (painter)
 Thomas George Cue (gold prospector who the town of Cue, WA was named after)
 Barry Gill (Australian Rules football player) 
 John Gill (Australian Rules football player)
 Dame Mary Gilmore (writer, political activist & journalist) 
 Murray Matheson (actor)
 Kathryn Mitchell (athlete)
 Alan Richardson (Australian Rules football player)
 Max Rooke (Australian Rules football player).

References

External links

Casterton Now -local information site
 Casterton District Pioneers and History
Easy version of Thomas Livingston Mitchell's Exploration, including Casterton
Short History of Casterton, Victoria

Towns in Victoria (Australia)
Western District (Victoria)